The Songyue Pagoda, constructed in AD 523, is located at the Songyue Monastery on Mount Song, in Henan province, China. Built during the Northern Wei Dynasty, this pagoda is one of the few intact sixth-century pagodas in China and is also the earliest known Chinese brick pagoda. Most structures from that period were made of wood and have not survived, although ruins of rammed earth fortifications still exist. In 2010, the Pagoda was inscribed on the UNESCO World Heritage List along with other nearby monuments as part of the 'Historic Monuments of Dengfeng in “The Centre of Heaven and Earth”' site.

Background

The spread of Buddhism dramatically influenced Chinese architecture. By the sixth century, Buddhism had spread with tremendous momentum throughout China: Chinese culture was adjusting and adapting its traditions to include Buddhism worship. The Chinese transformed the rounded earthen mound of the South Asian stupa into the towering pagoda to house the sacred buried relics of Buddha at its core.

Style and shape

The pagoda has had a changing shape over time from its Indian Buddhist origins to its form in China.  The unique many-sided shape of the Songyue Pagoda suggests that it represents an early attempt to merge the Chinese architecture of straight edges with the circular style of Buddhism from the Indian subcontinent. The perimeter of the pagoda decreases as it rises, as this is seen in Indian and Central Asian Buddhist cave temple pillars and the later round pagodas in China.

The Songyue Pagoda is unique in form, being twelve-sided. The tower is 40 m (131 ft) high and built of yellowish brick held together with clay mortar. It is the oldest surviving pagoda and was built at a time when, according to records, almost all pagodas were composed of wood.

The pagoda has a low, plain brick pedestal or base,  and a very high first story characteristic of pagodas with  multiple eaves, with balconies dividing the first story into two layers and doors connecting the two parts. The   ornamented arch doors and decorative apses or niches are intricately carved into teapots or lions. At the base of the door pillars are carvings shaped as lotus flowers and the  pillar capitals have carved  pearls and lotus flowers. After the first story there are fifteen  closely spaced roofs lined with eaves and  small lattice windows. The pagoda features densely clustered ornamental bracked eaves in the dougong style ornamenting each story. Inside the pagoda,  the wall is cylindrical with eight levels of projecting stone supports for what was probably  wooden flooring originally. 
Beneath the pagoda is an underground series of   burial rooms to preserve  cultural objects buried with the dead. The inner most chamber contained Buddhist relics, transcripts of Buddhist scriptures and statues of Buddha.

See also
Chinese pagoda
Dhamek Stupa

Footnotes

References

Yetts, Perceval W. "Writings on Chinese Architecture," The Burlington Magazine for Connoisseurs (Volume 50, Number 288, 1927): 116–131.

523
6th-century Buddhist temples
Towers completed in the 6th century
Pagodas in China
Northern Wei
Major National Historical and Cultural Sites in Henan
520s establishments
6th-century establishments in China
Stupas in Zhengzhou
Dengfeng
Buddhist temples in Zhengzhou